Stigmella suberivora is a moth of the family Nepticulidae. It is widespread in the western Mediterranean region, where it is found in Portugal, Spain, southern France (along the Atlantic coast northwards to Brittany), Italy, Corsica, Sardinia, Sicily, the Adriatic coast in Slovenia, Croatia and Bosnia. It is also found in North Africa, including Algeria and Tunisia. It is an introduced and established species in southern England. Records of leafmines in Mallorca are probably also this species.

The wingspan is 4.8-7.1 mm. Adults are on wing from April to October.

The larvae feed on Quercus coccifera, Quercus ilex, Quercus ilex rotundifolia and Quercus suber. They mine the leaves of their host plant. The mine consists of an irregular, broad corridor. The frass is concentrated in a broad frass line that almost fills the gallery, leaving only a narrow transparent zone at either side. Pupation takes place outside of the mine.

External links
 
 UKmoths
 Fauna Europaea
 Plant Parasites of Europe
 The Quercus Feeding Stigmella Species Of The West Palaearctic: New Species, Key And Distribution (Lepidoptera: Nepticulidae)

Nepticulidae
Moths described in 1869
Moths of Africa
Moths of Europe
Taxa named by Henry Tibbats Stainton